Conus is a genus of marine snails.

Conus may also refer to:

People:
Saint Conus (died 1200), Benedictine monk and saint
Georgi Conus (1862-1933), Russian composer, brother of Julius and Lev
Julius Conus (1869-1942), Russian violinist and composer, brother of Georgi and Lev
Lev Conus (1871–1944), Russian pianist, music educator, and composer, brother of Georgi and Julius
Serge Conus (1902-1988), Russian pianist and composer, son of Julius

Other uses:
Contiguous United States (CONUS)
Conus (Marietta, Ohio), a prehistoric Moundbuilders' mound in Marietta, Ohio, United States
, a U.S. Navy ship to be converted to landing craft repair ship USS Conus (ARL-44), but the conversion was cancelled

See also
Conus artery, present in only 45 percent of human hearts
Conus medullaris or conus terminalis, is the tapered, lower end of the spinal cord